Courante uyt Italien, Duytslandt, &c. ("Current Events from Italy, Germany, etc.") was the first Dutch newspaper. It began appearing in Amsterdam in June 1618 and was a regular weekly publication. The Courante can be called the first broadsheet paper, because it was issued in folio-size. Before this, news periodicals had been pamphlets in quarto-size.

The paper carries no imprint of the printer or the publisher. Similar papers published later suggest that it may have been printed by Joris Veseler and published and edited by Caspar van Hilten. The exact date of the publication is not known, but the dates of the news items suggest that it was probably printed between 14 and 18 June 1618.

The word "Courante" in the title of this and other news publications went on to supply the Dutch word for newspaper, krant (previously spelled courant, a spelling that is still used in the titles of many Dutch newspapers).

Format and typography
The Courante was a single folio sheet. This means it was a full sheet folded once to form 4 pages and then cut open at the fold. The first issues were printed on just one side of the sheet. It also does not have a serial number, a date or a publisher's imprint. These features are now considered essential to newspapers. The imprint appeared in 1619. The date and serial number as well as the practice of printing on both sides of the sheet started in 1620.

The first issue presented news from four sources, including Venice, Cologne and Prague. This corresponds with the name of the newspaper, which in English means "Current events from Italy, Germany, etc". The main text runs in two columns. The columns are separated with a gutter and a line running in it. There are no empty lines within the body text. The body of the text is printed in Dutch black-letter, except for the numbers. Roman type is used for datelines which also act as headlines for the news items. The text is fully justified and the beginnings of paragraphs are identified with indents approximately the size of the line-height.

The only surviving copy of the first issue is in Sweden's Kungliga Biblioteket in Stockholm. Later issues from 1628 to 1664 can be found at the Koninklijke Bibliotheek in The Hague.

The Courante appeared until about 1672 and was then merged with the Ordinarisse Middel-Weeckse Courant and the Ordinaris Dingsdaegse Courant into the Amsterdam Courant, which eventually merged with De Telegraaf in 1903.

Relevance

 Stanley Morison and some other authors regard the Courante as the world's first proper newspaper. In their view, the earlier news periodicals, such as the German Relation: aller Fürnemmen und gedenckwürdigen Historien and the Avisa Relation oder Zeitung, were not newspapers but pamphlets or newsbooks. They argue that the Courante was the first to express the typographic conventions that have been associated with newspapers ever since.
 Two years after starting the Courante, Veseler printed the first newspaper in English for the publisher Pieter van den Keere. It followed the format of the Courante.
 After the very beginning, English news periodicals reverted to the pamphlet form. However, in 1665 the Oxford Gazette was published following the style of the Dutch Courante and that ended the era of the newsbooks in England.

See also
List of newspapers by date

References

Sources
Dahl, F. (1946) Dutch corantos, 1618–1650 : a bibliography : illustrated with 334 facsimile reproductions of corantos printed 1618–1625, and an introductory essay on 17th century stop press news. Koninklijke Bibliotheek, The Hague.
 Morison, S. (1980) "The Origins of the Newspaper". In Selected Essays on the History of Letter-Forms in Manuscript and Print, (Ed, McKitterick, D.) Cambridge University Press, Cambridge.
 Morison, S. (1932) The English Newspaper : Some Account of the Physical Development of Journals Printed in London Between 1622 & the Present Day. Cambridge University Press, Cambridge.

External links
 See digitised copies from 1618 to 1670 of Courante uyt Italien, Duytslandt, &c. at The European Library Historic Newspapers and at Delpher

Defunct newspapers published in the Netherlands
17th-century documents
Mass media in Amsterdam
1618 establishments in the Dutch Republic
1672 disestablishments
Publications established in 1618
Publications disestablished in the 17th-century
Weekly newspapers published in the Netherlands